Heritage Open Days (also known as HODs) is an annual celebration of England's architecture and culture that allows visitors free access to historical landmarks that are either not usually open to the public, would normally charge an entrance fee, or that are always free to visitors and always open to the public. It also includes tours, events and activities related to architecture and culture.

Heritage Open Days is England's largest festival of history and culture, bringing together over 2,500 organisations, 5,000 events and 40,000 volunteers. Heritage Open Days 2018 ran from 6-9 and 13–16 September.

Heritage Open Days were established in 1994 as England's contribution to European Heritage Days, in which 49 countries now participate.

Organised by volunteers (often property owners or managers), Heritage Open Days is one of England's biggest voluntary cultural events, attracting some 800,000 people every year. Until April 2009 the Civic Trust gave central co-ordination and a national voice to the event.

Heritage Open Days does not cover all of the United Kingdom but operates only across England, except in London, which stages a separate event, Open House London, usually on the following weekend, the third weekend of September. In Scotland, Doors Open Days are held during September.

Heritage Open Days in 2018 
The 2018 festival took place across two weekends in September 2018 for the first time.

In 2018, Heritage Open Days celebrated 'Extraordinary Women', in order to profile underrepresented women, through non-zero one's put her forward initiative. The project is funded by People's Postcode Lottery.

See also 

 European Heritage Days
 Heritage Week in Ireland
 Visit My Mosque

References

External links 
 Heritage Open Days website
 London Open House website

Doors Open Days
Heritage Open Days
English culture
Architecture in England
Cultural heritage of England
Annual events in the United Kingdom
Events in England
Autumn events in England
Festivals established in 1994
1994 establishments in England